The term monument historique is a designation given to some national heritage sites in France. It may also refer to the state procedure in France by which National Heritage protection is extended to a building, a specific part of a building, a collection of buildings, garden, bridge, or other structure, because of their importance to France's architectural and historical cultural heritage. Both public and privately owned structures may be listed in this way, as well as also movable objects.

Examples of buildings classified as monument historique include well known Parisian structures such as the Eiffel Tower, the Louvre, and the Palais Garnier opera house, plus abbeys, churches such as Saint-Germain-des-Prés, and cathedrals such as Notre-Dame de Paris or hotels such as the Crillon. As of 2011 there were 1,816  monuments listed, 434 classé and 1,382 inscrit, in Paris.

Monuments historiques
Abbreviations: Arr. = arrondissement; Ref. = reference.

See also
 List of hôtels particuliers in Paris

External links
 Monuments historiques de Paris, Base Mérimée

 Monuments historiques of Paris
Monuments historiques
monuments historiques in Paris
monuments historiques in Paris
monuments historiques in Paris